Graham Douglas Stratford is an English farmer, local politician and agriculturist from Alton, Hampshire. He is an international breeder of pedigree Hereford cattle, and was the first Town Mayor of the Alton Town Council.

Originally a successful agricultural auctioneer, Stratford began farming in 1979 (after claiming four Hereford heifers abandoned at his auction), and progressed to full-time farming in 1987. He has been called "non-traditional" in his approach, and "dedicated to breed improvement," pioneering the cross-breeding of English cattle with Canadian stock. 

He was chair of the World Hereford Council for six years, president of the Hereford Breed Society (now Hereford Cattle Society) in 1996, and was awarded the Bromham Cup by the South of England Hereford Breeders Association for best herd in 1994, 1995, 1999 and 2006, in which year he also won best individual stock bull. In 2008 he continued his international work to develop the breed by successfully arranging the sale of a large consignment of Canadian-influenced English Hereford stock to Dutch breeders.

Stratford attended Churcher's College in Petersfield (graduating 1948) and went on to National service in the 1950s as second lieutenant (taking a posting in Singapore). He is a lifetime vice-president of the Alton RFC and a Master Mason. 

Throughout his career he has held an active presence in the community, working often with local schools (especially in agricultural outreach programmes), sponsoring the Alresford Show, and serving repeatedly as a local politician.  Stratford is a former Chairman of the old Alton Urban District Council, served as the first Town Mayor of the newly formed Alton Town Council in 1974, and regularly sat as a Councillor for both bodies.

References

People educated at Churcher's College
English farmers
People from Alton, Hampshire